Novobarnaulka is a rural locality (a selo) in Shilovsky Selsoviet, Kalmansky District, Altai Krai, Russia. The population was 121 as of 2013. There are 2 streets.

Geography 
Novobarnaulka is located 41 km northwest of Kalmanka (the district's administrative centre) by road. Chayachye is the nearest rural locality.

References 

Rural localities in Kalmansky District